An Zhisheng (born 25 February 1941) is a Chinese geographer and politician who specializes in quaternary geology, air particle pollution control, and global change. He is internationally known for his studies on Chinese loess and its implication for paleo-climate and paleo-environment changes. He is a member of the Chinese Academy of Sciences and The World Academy of Sciences (TWAS), and Foreign Associate of the National Academy of Sciences. He is a researcher and doctoral supervisor of the Institute of Earth Environment, Chinese Academy of Sciences. He is a member of the Communist Party of China. He is an editor of Quaternary Science Reviews. He served as the Vice Chairman of International Union for Quaternary Research (INQUA) from 1999 to 2007, and the Vice Chair of International Geosphere-Biosphere Programme (IGBP) steering committee from 2003 to 2006.

Biography
An Zhisheng was born on February 25, 1941, in Zhijiang County, Hunan, with his ancestral home in Lu'an, Anhui. His parents were both teachers. In 1952, he was accepted to the High School affiliated to Nanjing Normal University. After graduating from Nanjing University in 1966, he became a postgraduate at the Institute of Geology, Chinese Academy of Sciences. From 1966 to 1984, he was an assistant researchist at the Institute of Geochemistry, Chinese Academy of Sciences. He was appointed a research associate at the Laboratory of Xi'an Loess and Quaternary Geology, in 1985, becoming research scientist in 1989. In 1991, he was elected a fellow of the Chinese Academy of Sciences. In 1995, he was appointed director of the Laboratory of Xi'an Loess and Quaternary Geology and dean of the Xi'an Branch, Chinese Academy of sciences (Shanxi Provincial Academy of Sciences), serving until 2000. In 2000, he was elected a fellow of the World Academy of Sciences (TWAS). He was director of the Institute of Earth Environment, Chinese Academy of Sciences in 1999, and held that office until 2002. On May 3, 2016, he was elected Foreign Associate of the National Academy of Sciences.

He is a former member of the 14th and 15th National Congress of the Communist Party of China, and a former member of the 10th National People's Congress.

Awards
 National Prize for Natural Sciences
 Natural Science Award of the Chinese Academy of Sciences
 Shaanxi Provincial Science and Technology Progress Award
 Tan Kah Kee Earth Science Award
 Li Siguang Geological Science Award
 Science and Technology Award of the Ho Leung Ho Lee Foundation
 Outstanding Scientific Achievement Award of the Chinese Academy of Sciences

References

1941 births
Living people
Chinese geographers
Members of the Chinese Academy of Sciences
Nanjing University alumni
Politicians from Huaihua
Zhijiang Dong Autonomous County
TWAS fellows
Foreign associates of the National Academy of Sciences
Scientists from Hunan
People's Republic of China politicians from Hunan